Wurmbea saccata is a species of plant in the Colchicaceae family that is endemic to Australia.

Description
The species is a cormous perennial herb that grows to a height of 10–35 cm. Its pink or white flowers appear in June.

Distribution and habitat
The species is found in the Gascoyne IBRA bioregion of north-western Western Australia. It grows in gritty red soils, or damp silty soils with pebbles, in creek beds and on the margins of rock pools.

References

saccata
Monocots of Australia
Flora of Western Australia
Plants described in 1996
Taxa named by Terry Desmond Macfarlane